Route 168 is a  state route in the U.S. states of Massachusetts and Connecticut. The route connects the village of Congamond in the town of Southwick to the town center of Suffield. The route crosses over the Congamond Lake.  In Massachusetts, the road is town-maintained except for the bridge approach, which is state-maintained.

Route description
Route 168 begins at U.S. Route 202/Route 10 in Southwick, within the area known as the Congamond Notch (or Southwick Jog), site of a boundary dispute between Massachusetts and Connecticut. It crosses over Congamond Lake on a short bridge, at the east end of which it crosses the Connecticut state line into the town of Suffield. Route 168 continues east from the Congamond Lakes, passing by a highway picnic area, to Babbs Road (unsigned State Road 585), which is a road that leads directly to the town center of Southwick. From here, the road travels east, south, then east again towards the village of West Suffield, where it has a junction with Route 187. Route 168 continues east for another  until it ends at an intersection with Route 75 in Suffield center. The entire route is known as Congamond Road in Massachusetts and Mountain Road in Connecticut.

History
Route 168 was originally part of the original alignment of Route 190 when that road was created as part of the 1932 state highway renumbering. In 1975, Interstate 190 was formally assigned to a proposed expressway in Worcester, Massachusetts, which created a numbering conflict with Route 190. When Massachusetts renumbered its Route 190 to Route 168, Connecticut also renumbered the western portion of its Route 190 (west of Suffield center) to maintain number continuity across the state line.

Junction list

References

External links

168
Transportation in Hartford County, Connecticut
168
Transportation in Hampden County, Massachusetts
Suffield, Connecticut